
British NVC community MG3 (Anthoxanthum odoratum - Geranium sylvaticum grassland) is one of the mesotrophic grassland communities in the British National Vegetation Classification system. It is one of four such communities associated with well-drained permanent pastures and meadows.

This community is a localised community of northern England. There are three subcommunities.

Community composition

The following constant species are found in this community:
 Common Bent (Agrostris capillaris)
 The lady's-mantle (Alchemilla glabra)
 Sweet Vernal-grass (Anthoxanthum odoratum)
 Common Mouse-ear (Cerastium fontanum)
 Pignut (Conopodium majus)
 Cock's-foot (Dactylis glomerata)
 Red Fescue (Festuca rubra)
 Wood Crane's-bill (Geranium sylvaticum)
 Yorkshire-fog (Holcus lanatus)
 Ribwort Plantain (Plantago lanceolata)
 Rough Meadow-grass (Poa trivialis)
 Meadow Buttercup (Ranunculus acris)
 Common Sorrel (Rumex acetosa)
 Great Burnet (Sanguisorba officinalis)
 White Clover (Trifolium repens)

Five rare species of lady's-mantle Alchemilla are associated with this community: A. acutiloba, A. glomerulans, A. monticola, A. subcrenata and A. wichurae.

Distribution

This community, although widespread in the past, is now almost confined to a few upland valleys in County Durham, North Yorkshire and Cumbria.

Subcommunities

There are three subcommunities:
 the Bromus hordaceus ssp. hordaceus subcommunity
 the Briza media subcommunity
 the Arrhenatherum elatius subcommunity

References

 Rodwell, J. S. (1992) British Plant Communities Volume 3 - Grasslands and montane communities  (hardback),  (paperback)

MG03